The Jordan Rules were a successful defensive basketball strategy employed by the Detroit Pistons against Michael Jordan in order to limit his effectiveness in any game. Devised by Chuck Daly and his assistants at the time, Ron Rothstein and Dick Versace, after Jordan scored 59 points against them in April 1988, the Pistons' strategy was "to play him tough, to physically challenge him and to vary its defenses so as to try to throw him off balance." Sometimes the Pistons would overplay Jordan to keep the ball from him. "I don't think Chuck Daly wanted to hurt him, he was just looking to wear him out." Sometimes they would play him straight up, more often they would run a double-team at him as soon as he got the ball to force him to go left, which he was less successful in doing. He never wanted opponents to think they were good enough to affect him or his play. Winning the psychological battle was as important to Jordan as the physical one. Additionally, whoever Jordan was guarding on defense, Detroit would force that player to pass the  basketball in order to make Jordan work extremely hard on both ends of the court, thus increasing his fatigue level and rendering him less effective.

This strategy has also sometimes been employed against other prolific scoring guards. The Jordan Rules were an instrumental aspect of the rivalry between the "Bad Boys" Pistons and Jordan's Chicago Bulls in the late 1980s and early 1990s.  This style of defense limited players including Jordan from entering the paint and was carried out by Dennis Rodman and Bill Laimbeer.

The Jordan Rules were most effective for the Pistons during their first three playoff meetings with the Bulls. Detroit beat Chicago four games to one in 1988 then defeated the Bulls in six games in 1989 and seven games in 1990. The Pistons won back-to-back championships after eliminating the Bulls. Finally, in 1991, the Bulls defeated the Pistons in the playoffs, neutralizing the Jordan Rules with their triangle offense, orchestrated by coach Phil Jackson and assistant Tex Winter. They swept the Pistons in the 1991 Eastern Conference Finals. Soon after, the Bulls captured their first-ever NBA title, beating the Los Angeles Lakers in the NBA Finals 4 games to 1. The Pistons qualified for the playoffs again in 1992, 1996, 1997, 1999, and 2000, not advancing to the second round until 2002.

This strategy was later used by the New York Knicks from 1992 to 1998. However, the Knicks were not as successful as Detroit in containing Jordan and the Bulls. Jordan faced New York in the NBA Playoffs in 1991, 1992, 1993, and 1996. The Bulls eliminated the Knicks and captured NBA titles in all four of those seasons.

In an interview with Sports Illustrated, then Detroit Pistons coach Chuck Daly described the Jordan Rules as:

When doing an ESPN 30 for 30, Joe Dumars said:

References

Basketball terminology
Rules
1988 introductions
Basketball strategy
National Basketball Association history